Andriy Oleksandrovych Vlasyuk (born 28 May 1992) is a Ukrainian professional footballer who plays as a left back for Ukrainian club Polissya Zhytomyr.

References

External links
 Profile on Polissya Zhytomyr official website
 
 

1992 births
Living people
People from Korostyshiv
Piddubny Olympic College alumni
Ukrainian footballers
Association football defenders
FC CSKA Kyiv players
NK Veres Rivne players
FC Lviv players
SC Korosten players
FC Bukovyna Chernivtsi players
FC Naftovyk-Ukrnafta Okhtyrka players
FC Hirnyk-Sport Horishni Plavni players
FC Polissya Zhytomyr players
Ukrainian First League players
Ukrainian Second League players
Ukrainian Amateur Football Championship players
Sportspeople from Zhytomyr Oblast